Laurie Dearle (16 October 1919 – 25 October 1979) was an Australian rules footballer who played for Essendon in the Victorian Football League (VFL) during the 1940s.

Dearle started his career with East Fremantle and in 1942 arrived at Essendon under a war time service permit.

A premiership player in his debut season, Dearle kicked two goals as a centreman in the 1942 Grand Final win over Richmond. He appeared in another Grand Final the following season and finished on the losing team. In 1944 he kicked 23 goals for the year, over half of his final tally of career goals.

References

Holmesby, Russell and Main, Jim (2007). The Encyclopedia of AFL Footballers. 7th ed. Melbourne: Bas Publishing.

1919 births
1979 deaths
Essendon Football Club players
Essendon Football Club Premiership players
East Fremantle Football Club players
Australian rules footballers from Western Australia
One-time VFL/AFL Premiership players